Marcus is a masculine given name of Ancient Roman pre-Christian origin derived either from Etruscan Marce of unknown meaning or referring to the god Mars. Mars was identified as the Roman god of War.

The name is popular in Europe, particularly in Sweden, Norway, Italy and Germany, and increasingly, in the Netherlands.  It is also popular in English language countries, although less common than the shortened variation 'Mark', associated with the Gospel writer Mark the Evangelist. There are other variants.  Marcus ranks in the top 100 most popular boy names in Australia, Canada, England, Scotland, Sweden, and Wales since the 1990s, as well as the top 200 most popular boy names in the US since the 1960s.

Marcus developed as a patronymic or toponymic surname in Italy, southern France, and Spain around 1000 A.D., attributable to religious monasteries and sanctuaries named Sanctus Marcus (or its many variants). The surname was used as an identifier for the area of origin. The first historical record of the surname was in the year 1390 in Biberach an der Riß, Germany.

People with the name Marcus or its variants include:

Given name

Arts and entertainment

In art and literature
 Marcus Gheeraerts the Elder, Flemish artist
 Marcus Gheeraerts the Younger, Flemish artist
 Marcus Harvey, British artist
 Marcus Jansen, American painter.

In television and film
 Marcus Brigstocke, British comedian
Marcus Chang, Taiwanese actor and singer-songwriter 
 Marcus Dillistone, British film director
 Marcus Carl Franklin, American actor
 Marcus Toji, American actor

In music
 Marcus Adoro (born 1971), Philippine musician
 Marcus Collins (born 1988), runner-up on The X Factor 2011
 Marcus Ramone Cooper, a former member of the Miami, Florida R&B group Pretty Ricky
 Markus Feehily, lead vocalist of Irish pop vocal band Westlife
 Marcus Gunnarsen, member of Norwegian Pop Duo Marcus & Martinus
 Markus Grosskopf, bass player for the German power metal band Helloween
 Marcus Hopson, rapper, hook singer, music video director, and hip hop producer
 Markus James, current bassist for the rock group Breaking Benjamin
 Markus Kaarlonen, Finnish musician, songwriter, and producer
 Markus Löffel, disc jockey, musician and producer from Frankfurt am Main, Germany
 Marcus Miller, American bassist and clarinetist
 Marcus Mumford, singer, songwriter for Mumford and Sons
 Marcus Paus, Norwegian composer
 Markus Schulz, German trance music DJ and producer who currently resides in Miami, Florida, USA
 Marcus Siepen (born 1968), German guitarist in Blind Guardian
 Markus Stockhausen, German trumpeter and composer
 Markus Stopholese, American rock guitarist

In fictional characters
 Marcus, a paladin from the video games Fire Emblem: The Binding Blade and its prequel, Fire Emblem: The Blazing Blade
 Marcus, a vampire from the Twilight Saga
 Marcus Barnes, a fictional character from  The Electric Company
 Marcus Brody, a fictional character from The Last Crusade
 Marcus Burnett, a fictional police officer from the Bad Boys films
 Marcus Tullius Cicero (Rome character), a historical figure who features as a character in the HBO/BBC2 television series Rome
 Marcus Cole, a character in the novel and Netflix series 13 Reasons Why
 Marcus Cole, fictional character in Babylon 5
 Marcus Corvinus, the protagonist in David Wishart's historical detective novels. Also the name of a primary antagonist in the Underworld films
 Marcus Didius Falco, the protagonist in Lindsey Davis Ancient Rome historical mystery fictions
 Marcus Fenix, the primary protagonist from the Gears of War video game series
 Marcus Flint, Slytherin House Quidditch Team captain in the Harry Potter series
 Marcus Johnson, the alias of a Marvel Comics character and son of Nick Fury
 Marcus Ray, main character in Knock Off (film)
 Markus, one of the three android protagonists of the videogame Detroit: Become Human

Government
In Ancient Rome
 Marcus (son of Basiliscus), son and co-emperor of Basiliscus
 Marcus (usurper), emperor from Roman Britain in AD 406
 Marcus Aemilius Lepidus, member of the Second Triumvirate
 Marcus Antonius, commonly known in English as Mark Antony
 Marcus Aurelius, 16th Roman emperor from 161 to 180
 Marcus Junius Brutus, Roman patrician of the late Roman Republic
 Marcus Licinius Crassus, Roman general and politician who suppressed the slave revolt led by Spartacus
 Marcus Opellius Macrinus, Roman emperor from 217 to 218
 Marcus Porcius Cato, better known as Cato the Elder
 Marcus Porcius Cato Uticensis, better known as Cato the Younger
 Marcus Tullius Cicero, Roman statesman, lawyer, political theorist, and philosopher
 Marcus Ulpius Traianus, Roman emperor from 98 to 117
 Marcus Vipsanius Agrippa, Roman statesman and general

In politics
 Markus Buchart, Manitoba politician
 Markus Feldmann, Swiss politician
 Markus Ferber, German politician and Member of the European Parliament for Bavaria with the Christian Social Union in Bavaria
 Marcus Fernando (1864-1936), Sri Lankan Sinhala physician, banker, and member of the Legislative Council of Ceylon
 Markus Ganserer, German politician
 Marcus Garvey, Jamaican/African-American activist
 Markus Kallifatides (born 1972), Swedish politician
 Markus Pieper, German politician and Member of the European Parliament for North Rhine-Westphalia
 Marcus Reno, United States career military officer

Sports
 Marcus Allbäck, Swedish footballer and coach
 Marcus Allen (disambiguation), multiple people
 Marcus Aurélio, (born 1973), Brazilian mixed martial artist
 Markus Babbel, German footballer and coach
 Markus Bailey (born 1997), American football player
 Marcus Baugh (born 1994), American football player
 Markus Beyer, German boxer
 Marcus Camby, American basketball player
 Marcus Cor Von, American wrestler, real name Monty Brown
 Marcus Vinicius de Morais, Brazilian footballer
 Marcus Davenport (born 1996), American football player
 Markus Dieckmann, German beach volleyball player
 Marcus Dove (born 1985), American basketball player
 Markus Egger, Swiss beach volleyball player
 Marcus Epps (disambiguation), multiple people
 Marcus Ericsson, Swedish Formula 1 driver
 Marcus Foligno, Canadian-American ice hockey player
 Marcus Gaither (1961–2020), American-French basketball player
 Marcus Green (disambiguation), multiple people
 Marcus Grönholm, Finnish rally driver
 Marcus Haber, Canadian soccer player
 Marcus Hatten, basketball player in Israel Basketball Premier League
 Markus Halsti, Finnish footballer
 Marcus Hardison, American football player
 Markus Heikkinen, Finnish footballer
 Marcus Henry (disambiguation), multiple people
 Marcus Hinton, American football player
 Marcus Horan, Ireland and Munster rugby player
 Markus Howard (born 1999), American basketball player
 Marcus Jensen, American baseball player and coach
 Marcus Johnson, American football offensive lineman
 Marcus Johnson, American football wide receiver
 Markus Keller (triathlete), Swiss triathlon athlete
 Marcus Keyes (born 1973), American gridiron football player
 Marcus Mailei, American gridiron football player
 Marcus Mariota, American gridiron football player
 Marcus Mattioli, Brazilian swimmer
 Markus Mattsson, Finnish ice hockey player
 Marcus Maye, American gridiron football player
 Markus Merk, German football referee
 Markus Näslund, Swedish ice hockey player
 Markus Neumayr, German footballer
 Markus Niemelä, Finnish racing driver
 Marcus Nilson, Swedish ice hockey player
 Marcus Norris (born 1974), American basketball player
 Markus Oscarsson, Swedish flatwater canoeist
 Markus Paatelainen, Finnish footballer
 Markus Paul (1966-2020), American football coach and player
 Markus Penz, Austrian male skeleton racer
 Marcus Peters (born 1993), American football player
 Markus Pröll, German footballer
 Marcus Rashford, English footballer
 Marcus Relphorde (born 1988), American basketball player in the Israeli National League
 Markus Rogan, Austrian swimmer
 Marcus Rose, English rugby player
 Markus Rosenberg, Swedish footballer
 Markus Rühl, German bodybuilder
 Marcus Sandell, Finnish alpine skier
 Marcus Santos-Silva (born 1997), American basketball and football player
 Marcus Semien (born 1990), American baseball player
 Marcus Smart (born 1994), American basketball player
 Marcus Stoinis, Australian cricketer
 Marcus Stroman, American baseball player
 Marcus Thames, American baseball player and coach
 Marcus Thigpen, American gridiron football player
 Marcus Trescothick, English cricketer
 Marcus Urban, German footballer
 Marcus Velado-Tsegaye, Canadian soccer player
 Markus Wasmeier, German alpine skier
 Markus Weise, German field hockey player and coach
 Markus Weissenberger, Austrian footballer
 Marcus Wilson (disambiguation), multiple people
 Markus Winkelhock, German auto racing driver
 Marcus Williams (basketball, born 1985), American basketball player
 Marcus Williams (safety), American football player

Other
 Marcus (Manichean), missionary in Spain
 Marcus (Marcosian), founder of the Marcosians
 Marcus Benedict, alternative name of Mordecai Benet, chief rabbi of Moravia
 Markus Breitschmid, Swiss Architectural theoretician and author
 Markus J. Buehler, American materials scientist
 Marcus Butler, English YouTube vlogger
 Marcus du Sautoy, English mathematician
 Marcus Einfeld (born 1938), Australian former Superior Court Judge
 Markus Hess, computer prodigy and hacker
 Markus Kuhn (computer scientist), German computer scientist
 Marcus Loew, American business magnate, founder of the Metro-Goldwyn-Mayer film studio
 Markus Meechan, Scottish Youtuber
 Markus Mosse, German physician
 Markus Persson, Swedish indie game developer
 Marcus Sarjeant, UK man who fired blanks at the Queen
 Marcus Schenkenberg, Swedish male supermodel
 Markus Selin (born 1978), Swedish politician
 Marcus B. Toney (c. 1840–1929), American Confederate veteran, Klansman, Masonic leader and memoirist
 Markus Nissa Weiss, Hungarian advocate of reform
 Markus Wolf, former East German spymaster

Surname

 Adam W. Marcus (born 1979), American mathematician
 Claude-Gérard Marcus (1933–2020), French politician
 David Marcus (1924–2009), President of PayPal
 Eric Marcus (born 1958), nonfiction author and journalist
 Ernst Gustav Gotthelf Marcus (1893–1968), malacologist
 Eveline Du Bois-Reymond Marcus (1901–1990), zoologist
 Frank I. Marcus (1928-2022), American physician
 Gary Marcus (born 1970), research psychologist and author
 George Marcus (disambiguation), several people
 George E. Marcus, American anthropologist
 George M. Marcus (born 1941), American billionaire real estate broker, founder of Marcus & Millichap
 Greil Marcus (born 1945), American author
 Jacob Rader Marcus (1896–1995), US reform rabbi
 James S. Marcus (1929–2015), American investment banker and philanthropist
 Joan Marcus, American theatrical photographer
 Jürgen Marcus (1948–2018), German singer 
 Ken Marcus (born 1946), American photographer
 Lauren Marcus, American actress
 Lee Marcus (1893–1969), American filmmaker
 Louis W. Marcus (1863–1923), American lawyer and judge
 Mickey Marcus (1901–1948), American jurist and colonel
 Morton Marcus (1936–2009), American poet and author
 Nancy Marcus (1950–2018), American biologist and college administrator
 Rudolph A. Marcus (born 1923), chemist and Nobel Prize winner
 Siegfried Marcus (1831–1898), German-Austrian inventor
 Simon Marcus (born 1986), Canadian-Jamaican Muay Thai kickboxer
 Sol Marcus (1912–1976), American songwriter
 Solomon Marcus (1925–2016), Romanian mathematician
 Stanley Marcus (1905–2002), co-founder of Neiman Marcus

Markus

 Dov Markus (born 1946), Israeli-American soccer player
 Gabriela Markus, Brazilian model
 Hazel Rose Markus, American psychologist
 Kurt Markus, American photographer
 Louis Marcoussis, former name Ludwik Kazimierz Wladyslaw Markus, Polish-born French painter and engraver
 Louise Markus, Australian politician
 Rixi Markus, Austrian and later British bridge player

Márkus
 Erzsébet Márkus, Hungarian weightlifter
 György Márkus, Jewish Hungarian philosopher
 Robert Markuš, Serbian chess Grandmaster

References

See also
 Marcus (praenomen)
 Marques (disambiguation)
 Mark (given name)
 Marcus Vinicius (disambiguation)
 DeMarcus, given name
 Jamarcus, given name

Danish masculine given names
English masculine given names
German masculine given names
Norwegian masculine given names
Swedish masculine given names
Masculine given names
Sephardic surnames
Jewish surnames
Surnames from given names